The discography of Australian musician Richard Clapton spawned sixteen studio albums, six compilation albums, three live albums, one soundtrack album, and forty-one singles.

Studio albums

Compilation albums

Live albums

Notes
° Australian Music DVD Chart.

Soundtrack albums

Singles

Notes

A."Girls on the Avenue" was originally released as the B-side of "Travelling Down the Castlereagh". After considerable radio play it was named the A-side.

References

Discographies of Australian artists
Rock music discographies